ICP srl is an Italian wiring harness, automotive brake wear indicator and aircraft manufacturer founded by Tancredi (Edi) Razzano in 1980 and originally based in Piovà Massaia. The company relocated to Castelnuovo Don Bosco in Piedmont on 10 September 2009. ICP specializes in the design and manufacture of kit aircraft for amateur construction.

History
ICP was founded in 1980 to produce wiring harnesses for the automotive, electromechanical and domestic appliance markets. In 1984 the company expanded into designing and producing wear indicators for disc and drum brakes for cars,  industrial vehicles and motorcycles. The company provides wear indicators that are used by Alfa Romeo, Audi, Citroen, Chevrolet Corvette, Daf, Ferrari, Fiat, Iveco, Lamborghini, Lancia, Maserati, Peugeot, Renault and Volvo.

In the late 1990s Razzano decided to use the considerable investment he had made in CNC machining to produce kit aircraft, beginning with the ICP Bingo and Savannah aircraft. The use of the CNC machines allowed kits to be produced at low cost, making the company very competitive in the kit aircraft market. Zenith STOL CH 701 designer Chris Heintz considers the Savannah an unauthorized copy of his design.

On 15 January 2012, ICP announced a collaborative production effort with Zenair of Canada to produce the Zenair CH650 at their plant, under the designation CH650Ei.

ICP is currently developing an aviation engine, designated the ICP M09. The engine was designed by Franco Lambertini, previously with Moto Morini motorcycles. The M09 has no parts in common with other Lambertini motorcycle engines, but is a clean-sheet design for aviation use. The engine is a four stroke, two cylinder, four valve,  powerplant that delivers  at 7000 rpm and is capable of inverted flight. The first flight on an ICP Savannah S was on 18 December 2014.

Aircraft

References

External links

 

Aircraft manufacturers of Italy
Homebuilt aircraft
Auto parts suppliers of Italy